Harriet Taylor may refer to:
 Harriet Taylor Mill, British philosopher and women's rights advocate
 Harriet Taylor (rower), British rower
 Harriet Taylor Upton, American political activist and author
 Harriet Taylor Treadwell, American suffragist and educator